This Is Medicine is the only studio album by American hardcore band Reversal Of Man, released on August 9, 1999 through Ebullition Records. Jeremy Bolm of Touché Amoré named the album as one of his favorites.

Background 
Reversal Of Man first formed in 1995 in Tampa, Florida and spent most of their time as a band touring and releasing music before breaking up in 2000. In July 1996, their split 12" vinyl with Canadian band Holocron was released through Intention Records, which caught the attention of Ebullition Records owner Kent McClard, who eventually agreed to release This Is Medicine (after plans fell through to release the album through Intention Records). To support the album, the band toured across Europe during the spring of 1999, and they subsequently toured the United States during the summer of that same year with Combatwoundedveteran.

The album was recorded at Morrisound Recording and at The House Of Doom, with production and recording duties being done by Steve Heritage of Assück.

Track listing

Personnel 
Matt Coplon – vocals
Dan Radde – guitar, vocals
Chris Norris – guitar
Jeff Howe – bass, vocals
John Willey – drums
Steve Heritage – production, recording

References

External links 
 This Is Medicine on Bandcamp
 
 Archived Reversal of Man website featuring 1999 tour dates

1999 albums
Reversal of Man albums